Brahmaea hearseyi  is a species of moth of the family Brahmaeidae. It is found in N.E. Himalaya, Burma, Western China, Sundaland and the Philippines.

The wingspan ranges up to 200 mm.

The larvae feed on Ligustrum, Syringa, and Fraxinus species.

Taxonomy
Brahmaea celebica was formerly treated as a subspecies of Brahmaea hearseyi.
The Moths of Borneo

External links
 Subspecies Celebica info

Brahmaeidae
Moths described in 1862
Moths of Asia
Moths of Borneo